Lazy Smoke was a psychedelic rock/psychedelic pop band from Haverhill, Massachusetts, United States. They formed in 1967, quietly released an LP in 1968 entitled Corridor of Faces on Onyx records before disbanding in 1969. While the band did not get much attention at the time, Corridor of Faces has come to be regarded as a lost gem of the psychedelic era, with original copies of the album fetching as much as $2700 USD.

Discography
Corridor of Faces (1969)

External links
[ Lazy Smoke profile] on Allmusic

Psychedelic rock music groups from Massachusetts
Psychedelic pop music groups
Musical groups established in 1967
Musical groups disestablished in 1969